The 2020–21 USC Trojans women's basketball team represented the University of Southern California during the 2020–21 NCAA Division I women's basketball season. The Trojans play their home games at the Galen Center and are members of the Pac-12 Conference. The squad was led by head coach Mark Trakh, who was in the 4th year of his 2nd stint (9th year overall). This year, the season was shortened to accommodate safety measures due to the COVID-19 pandemic. As such, no fans were permitted at any of the games.

USC finished the regular season 10–11 (8–10) and earned the 8th seed in the 2020 Pac-12 Conference women's basketball tournament.

Previous season
The 2019–20 Women of Troy finished unranked with an overall record of 17–14. In Pac-12 play, their record was 8–10, and they finished in seventh place. Because of the pandemic, the previous season ended abruptly after the Pac-12 Tournament, at which the Women of Troy reached the quarterfinals.

Offseason changes

Departures

Incoming transfers

2020 recruiting class

Current roster

Player recognition
Alyson Miura
Pac-12 Academic Honor Roll
Amaya Oliver
All Pac-12 Freshman Team Honorable Mention
India Otto
Pac-12 Academic Honor Roll
Alissa Pili 
Last year, Pili was selected as Pac-12 Freshman of the Year for the previous season. She was also a member of the All Pac-12 Team and the Freshman All Pac-12 Team.
Pili was recognized with preseason awards as a member of the 2020–21 Pac-12 Women's Basketball Preseason Media All-Conference Team.
Just before the season started, Pili was added to the watchlists for both the Katrina McClain Power Forward of the Year Award and the 2021 Jersey Mike's Naismith Trophy.
Honored as Pac-12 Player of the Week on February 8, 2021.
All Pac-12 Honorable Mention
Endiya Rogers
The Pac-12 recognized Rogers with a preseason All-Conference Honorable Mention.
On February 1, 2021, Rogers was recognized as the Pac-12 Player of the Week.
All Pac-12 Team
Jordan Sanders
On December 28, 2020, Sanders was announced as the Pac-12 Player of the Week.
Two days later, she was recognized again, this time as a member of the NCAA's Starting Five for Week 5.
All Pac-12 Honorable Mention

Injuries
Tinner's (knee) debut as a Trojan took place on December 13, 2020 against UCLA. 
Jenkins (foot) debuted against Utah on January 8, 2021.
Campbell was out from January 8, 2021 until February 5, 2021.
Pili (ankle) returned to play against Washington State on January 15, 2021.
Aaron (ankle) made her return to the court against UCR on January 17, 2021. She had been out for nearly two years.
Jackson missed the Long Beach State game. She was then absent for the away games against Washington and Washington State.
Miura (knee) made her first appearance this season on February 5, 2021 against Washington.
Sanders was injured on January 31, 2021 against ASU. She returned to play on February 12, 2021 against Colorado.

Schedule

|-
!colspan=9 style=| Regular Season

|-
!colspan=9 style=| Pac-12 Women's Tournament

Rankings
2020–21 NCAA Division I women's basketball rankings

References

USC Trojans women's basketball seasons
USC
USC Trojans basketball, women
USC Trojans basketball, women
USC Trojans basketball, women
USC Trojans basketball, women